Fellows of the Royal Society elected in 1953.

Fellows

John Stuart Anderson
Kenneth Bailey
Henry Barcroft
John Barker
John Charles Burkill
Sir John Warcup Cornforth
Sir Samuel Curran
Charles Sutherland Elton
 Sir Otto Frankel
Ernest Gale
Alfred Gordon Gaydon
 Sir Arnold Alexander Hall
Geoffrey Wingfield Harris
 Sir Claude Cavendish Inglis
Willis Jackson, Baron Jackson of Burnley
 Sir James Lighthill
George Hoole Mitchell
Lionel Sharples Penrose
Herbert Marcus Powell
Alan Richard Powell
Victor Rothschild, 3rd Baron Rothschild
David Shoenberg
Thomas Wallace
David Whitteridge
Sir Richard van der Riet Woolley

Foreign members

Louis Victor Pierre Raymond de Broglie, Duc de Broglie
Robert Courrier
Hermann Joseph Muller
Wolfgang Ernst Pauli

References

1953
1953 in science
1953 in the United Kingdom